Kinjiro Nagai (May 3, 1874 – April 3, 1927) was Director of the Karafuto Agency (April 17, 1919 – June 11, 1924). He was also mayor of Otaru and Governor of Kōchi Prefecture (1913–1914).

References
『新編日本の歴代知事』945頁。
『「現代物故者事典」総索引 : 昭和元年～平成23年 1 (政治・経済・社会篇)』862頁。
『日本官僚制総合事典：1868 - 2000』177頁。
『官報』第6925号、明治39年7月30日。
『官報』第1333号、大正6年1月15日。
『日本官僚制総合事典：1868 - 2000』127頁。
『官報』第3548号、大正13年6月21日。

Bibliography
歴代知事編纂会編『新編日本の歴代知事』歴代知事編纂会、1991年。
秦郁彦編『日本官僚制総合事典：1868 - 2000』東京大学出版会、2001年。
『「現代物故者事典」総索引 : 昭和元年～平成23年 1 (政治・経済・社会篇)』日外アソシエーツ株式会社、2012年。

1874 births
1927 deaths
Governors of Kochi Prefecture
Mayors of places in Hokkaido
People from Otaru
Directors of the Karafuto Agency
Chuo University alumni
People from Niigata Prefecture